Musquapsink Brook is a tributary of Pascack Brook in Bergen County, New Jersey in the United States.

The headwater lies within Woodcliff Lake and runs south through Hillsdale and into Washington Township.  There it runs into Schlegel Lake before continuing south and east into Westwood.  In Westwood, it runs into Bogert Pond before briefly turning north and joining the Pascack Brook at the border between Westwood and River Vale.

At least one late 18th-century map labels Musquapsink Brook "Little Pascack River" (the modern Pascack Brook is shown as "Great Pascack River").

See also
List of rivers of New Jersey

References

External links
mouth 
source 

Rivers of Bergen County, New Jersey
Hackensack River
Pascack Valley
Rivers of New Jersey